Jaze Kabia (born 7 August 2000) is an Irish professional football player who plays as a winger for Queen of the South, on loan from Livingston. He started his career with Cobh Ramblers where he spent a season and a half, before moving to Shelbourne, where he earned his move to Livingston. He has also had loan spells with Falkirk and Greenock Morton.

Early career
Kabia began playing with College Corinthians in Cork where he played from age 5 until age 15, including two years alongside Adam Idah. He left the club to join another local side, Douglas Hall at age 15. In 2017, he made the move to one of his father Jason Kabia's old clubs, Cobh Ramblers, playing for their Under-17 side where he would play for a season.

Club career

Cobh Ramblers
Kabia was called straight up to the Cobh Ramblers  senior squad ahead of the 2018 League of Ireland First Division season, bypassing the club's Under-19 side. He made his debut in senior football on 9 March 2018, in a 1–0 win away to Cabinteely. On 13 April 2018, he scored his first goals in senior football, scoring a brace in a 4–1 win over Athlone Town at the Athlone Town Stadium. Kabia made three appearances in Cobh Ramblers League Cup campaign as they made it all the way to the final but were beaten by Derry City with Kabia an unused substitute on the day. He finished his first season in senior football with 26 appearances and 2 goals to his name across all competitions.

His second season saw him reach a great run of form in which he reached a tally of 9 goals in 22 appearances in all competitions. This form saw League of Ireland First Division leaders Shelbourne show an interest in him to help their promotion charge in the second half of the season.

Shelbourne
On 11 July 2019, it was announced that Kabia had signed for Dublin club Shelbourne. 8 days later, he scored on his debut in a vital 2–1 win over Athlone Town as his side's title race continued. He was sent off for the first time in his career in controversial fashion as he was shown a second yellow card for time wasting while exiting the pitch after being substituted with his side 2–0 up away to Bohemians in an FAI Cup tie. After the red card his side capitulated, losing 3–2. Kabia and Shelbourne clinched Promotion as well as the 2019 League of Ireland First Division title after beating second placed Drogheda United on 13 September 2019. He scored his first senior hat-trick in a 7–0 win over Limerick on the final night of the season, before the club were awarded the league trophy, the first of Kabia's career. He scored an impressive 5 league goals in 5 games over his half season with Shels.

Kabia started off his first season in the League of Ireland Premier Division well, scoring the winner in a 1–0 Dublin derby win over St Patrick's Athletic on 22 February 2020. Following the COVID-19 pandemic, the league season was halved in games and Shelbourne struggled for form towards the end of the season, which saw the season ended in disappointment for the club and Kabia, as they were relegated back to the League of Ireland First Division with Kabia scoring 1 goal in his 13 appearances in all competitions.

Livingston
On 8 January 2021, Kabia signed a two-and-a-half year contract with Scottish Premiership side Livingston. Manager David Martindale stated on the day he signed that the club would look at possibly loaning him out for experience. He made his debut on 20 January 2021, in a 2–2 draw with Celtic at the Tony Macaroni Arena. He was heavily involved in the action on his debut as Celtic captain Scott Brown received a straight red card for striking Kabia in the face, while he earned praise from his manager who stated that Kabia has 'massive potential'. On 27 January 2021, he scored his first goal for the club, coming off the bench to open the scoring in the 89th minute of a 2–0 win over Kilmarnock.

Falkirk (loan) 
On 21 January 2022, Kabia joined Scottish League One club Falkirk on loan until the end of the season. He made his debut the following day, coming off the bench to score two second-half goals as Falkirk beat East Fife 2-0.

Greenock Morton (loan) 
On 7 July 2022, Kabia joined Scottish Championship club Greenock Morton on a season-long loan. He would be recalled by his parent club in January 2023.

Queen of the South (loan) 
On 27 January 2023, Kabia joined Scottish League One club Queen of the South on loan until the end of the season.

Personal life
Jaze Kabia is the son of Jason Kabia, a former professional footballer that played in England, Malta and Ireland, finishing his career with his son's first professional club, Cobh Ramblers. He is also best friends with Republic of Ireland and Norwich City striker Adam Idah since childhood, with the pair knowing each other since the age of 7 and playing on various teams together.

Career statistics

Honours

Shelbourne
 League of Ireland First Division: 2019

References

2000 births
Living people
Republic of Ireland association footballers
Association footballers from Cork (city)
Association footballers from County Cork
Association football wingers
Cobh Ramblers F.C. players
Shelbourne F.C. players
Livingston F.C. players
Falkirk F.C. players
Greenock Morton F.C. players
League of Ireland players
Scottish Professional Football League players
Expatriate footballers in Scotland
Republic of Ireland expatriate association footballers
Queen of the South F.C. players
Irish people of English descent